Trammell Crow Center is a 50-story postmodern skyscraper at 2001 Ross Avenue in the Arts District of downtown Dallas, Texas. It was originally built as the new headquarters of Ling-Temco-Vought, which had outgrown its previous headquarters at 1600 Pacific Tower.

Trammell & Margaret Crow Collection of Asian Art, an arts venue showcasing artwork owned by the Crows, is at the building's base.

The building underwent widescale renovations, beginning in 2017, to attract a newer workforce and update amenities, including over 20,000 square feet of new retail space, a conference center, and gym on the bottom two floors. This renovation is being undertaken by Stream Realty.

Major tenants
 Goldman Sachs
 Stream Realty Partners
 Vinson and Elkins
 Baker Botts
 Citigroup
 Invesco

See also

List of tallest buildings in Dallas
 List of tallest buildings in Texas

References

External links

Trammell Crow Center - Official website

Skyscraper office buildings in Dallas
Buildings and structures in Dallas
Office buildings completed in 1985
1985 establishments in Texas